Padina is a village in Ardino Municipality, Kardzhali Province, southern-central Bulgaria, located in a valley at the foot of Mount St. Elias (1001m). It covers an area of 10.411 square kilometres and as of 2007 had a population of 1030 people, although the population is rapidly declining and 851 were reported in 2010.

Padina has a continental Mediterranean climate, with a climate which is characterized by mild, humid winters and hot, dry summers. Crops include tobacco and potatoes, and small areas are favorable for growing sugar beets, strawberries and some vegetables ( tomatoes, peppers, beans, etc.). Over the last decades, several apple orchards have been established. The village operates a dairy farm that produces high quality cheese, yogurt, butter, melted and smoked cheese and curd. Padina has a primary school, kindergarten and community centre with a library.

References

Villages in Kardzhali Province